Nathalie Lartilleux is a French television producer, who is an executive producer at Televisa. She is best known for her telenovela, Cuidado con el ángel.

Career 
Lartilleux began her career by being an associate producer of the telenovelas produced by her husband, Salvador Mejía. Among their productions are Esmeralda, Rosalinda, and La usurpadora. She debuted as an outright producer in 2004 with the telenovela Inocente de Ti, starring Camila Sodi, Valentino Lanus, and Helena Rojo. Later, in 2005, she produced Peregrina, which turned out to be an unexpected success, starring África Zavala and Eduardo Capetillo. In 2008, her career took off when she produced the internationally successful Cuidado con el Ángel, starring Maite Perroni and William Levy.

Filmography

Television

References

Living people
Mexican telenovela producers
French emigrants to Mexico
Year of birth missing (living people)